Tanychau (Tanısaw) is a rural locality (a village) in Akhunovsky Selsoviet, Uchalinsky District, Bashkortostan, Russia. The population was 71 as of 2010. There are 3 streets.

Geography 
Tanychau is located 33 km southeast of Uchaly (the district's administrative centre) by road. Buyda is the nearest rural locality.

References 

Rural localities in Uchalinsky District